Daryl E. Johnson (born August 11, 1946) is a former American football defensive back who played in the American Football League, the National Football League, and the World Football League. He was a member of the Boston Patriots and was a member of the Patriots 1960s All-Decade Team.

College career
Johnson graduated from Maggie L. Walker High School in Richmond. He entered Morgan State University in 1964 and received his Bachelor of Science in Business Administration degree.  Mr. Johnson (5'10½"/170 lbs), was an invited walk-on at Morgan State, where he became a four-year letterman in football playing on three undefeated CIAA Championship football teams from 1965–1967, and was a two-year letterman in track and field.

Mr. Johnson acquired many honors during his amazing college football career: however, he carved his own piece of Morgan State athletic history as the starting quarterback during the undefeated 1966 and 1967 CIAA Championship football seasons. In 1966, Morgan State University became the first predominantly African American team selected to play in the NCAA sanctioned Tangerine Bowl (now called the Capital One Bowl). Mr. Johnson led the Morgan State Golden Bears on one of the biggest stages the University had been on to a historic 14-6 victory over West Chester State (PA). The victory earned Morgan State University the distinction of being crowned the first historically black college or university (HBCU) to win a nationally recognized NCAA Championship Title, Atlantic Coast Champions. Mr. Johnson ended the 1966 season being selected to the first-team Maryland All-State Team as a Placekicker and first-team ALL-CIAA.

During the 1967 season, Daryl led the Golden Bears to their third consecutive CIAA Championship and undefeated seasons.  He set a school record by becoming the first quarterback to pass for over 1,000 yards in a single season, completing 54 percent of his passes for 1,050 yards.  His senior year performance was so outstanding that he was selected first Team Maryland All-State as Quarterback, first Team All-CIAA Quarterback and first Team Pittsburgh Courier Black All-American Defensive Back.

Daryl finished his career leading Morgan State to the longest winning streak in college football at the time. The Golden Bears only lost two games during Mr. Johnson's four-year career. While playing for Morgan, Daryl played quarterback, flanker, defensive back and was the teams placekicker.

Johnson is a member of Morgan State University's Varsity "M" Club athletic Hall Of Fame.

Professional career
Johnson was selected 1968 Common Draft in the 8th round. He would play for the American Football League's Boston Patriots (1968–1969), the National Football League's Boston Patriots (1970). Johnson became a starter in his rookie season.  He was selected to the Boston Patriots All-Time Team of the Decades of the 1960s and honored at a special pre-game and halftime ceremony on December 5, 1971 at Schaefer in conjunction with Gino Cappelletti Day.  Daryl was also a starting defensive back in the World Football League with the Houston Texans/Shreveport Steamers.

Personal
Johnson is married to Helen Griffin, and they have two children, Deron and Brandi, as well as one granddaughter, Nevaeh.

References

The Daily Times, Salisbury, Maryland 11/27/67
Kingsport Time News 12/11/66
Afro American October 1967
Afro American December 1967
UPI Feb. 1968

1946 births
Living people
American football cornerbacks
Boston Patriots players
Houston Texans (WFL) players
Morgan State Bears football players
New England Patriots players
Shreveport Steamer players
Players of American football from Richmond, Virginia
American Football League players